Cristina Fuentes La Roche OBE is International Director at Hay Festival, which she has worked at since 2005. She has been involved in creating and directing these festivals in areas including Colombia, Spain, Mexico, Lebanon, and Perú.

Career
Fuentes La Roche’s early career had her working three years at Canning House, and was later the Director of the National Events at Arts and Business for five years. In 2006, she created Hay Festival Cartagena de Indias, Colombia, Hay Festival Segovia, Spain (where she served as a co-director), and in 2010, Hay Festival Querétaro in Mexico. She later worked on Hay Festival Beirut, Lebanon since 2011, though it has since been interrupted. In 2015, she began work on Hay Festival Arequipa, Perú since 2015. She has also been responsible for multiple projects which sought to promote upcoming literary young talent. These included Bogotá39 in both 2007 and 2017, Beirut39 in 2010, and Africa39 in 2014 at the Port Harcourt Unesco World Book Capital. In 2015, she managed Mexico20, Aarhus39, and in 2020 Europa28.

Honours
Fuentes La Roche has received multiple honours.

 Fuentes La Roche was awarded an Order of the British Empire for her service in promoting British culture and values in the Spanish-speaking world.
 In 2020, She collected the Princess of Asturias Awards for Communication and Humanities, which was awarded to the Hay Festival.
 In 2021, she served as a judge of the Alfaguara Prize.

References 

Living people
Festival directors
Honorary Members of the Order of the British Empire
Year of birth missing (living people)